Malin Susanna Margareta Birgerson (born 28 January 1968 in Täby, Stockholm County, Sweden) is a Swedish actress.

Birgerson studied from 1992–95 at the NAMA in Malmö. After that she acted in different Swedish theatres including the Stockholm City Theatre in 1997. Birgerson became popular as the police inspector Alice Levander in Season 2 of the Beck-films. Since February 2007, she has worked in the Swedish Theatre Federation. Birgerson is married to journalist Sven Irving from TV4.

Filmography 
Soldater i månsken (2000)
Beck – Mannen utan ansikte (2001)
Beck – Kartellen (2002)
Beck – Enslingen (2002)
Beck – Okänd avsändare (2002)
Beck – Annonsmannen (2002)
Beck – Pojken i glaskulan (2002)
Beck – Sista vittnet (2002)
 2002 – Nya tider
2003 - Skeppsholmen
 2005 – Kommissionen

References

External links 

1968 births
Living people
Swedish television actresses
Swedish stage actresses